Richard Hayes Monteith (20 July 1887 – 27 October 1959) was an Australian rules footballer who played with Essendon in the Victorian Football League (VFL).

Monteith was a half back flanker in Essendon's 1911 premiership team. Essendon were premiers again in 1912, but Monteith left the club after two games that year, to join Brighton.

References

1887 births
Australian rules footballers from Melbourne
Essendon Football Club players
Essendon Football Club Premiership players
Northcote Football Club players
Brighton Football Club players
1959 deaths
One-time VFL/AFL Premiership players
People from Williamstown, Victoria